Selkup may refer to:
 Selkup people, a people living between the Ob and Yenisei rivers in Siberia, Russia
 Selkup language, their language

Language and nationality disambiguation pages